The 1998 FIA GT Donington 500 km was the seventh round the 1998 FIA GT Championship season.  It took place at Donington Park, United Kingdom, on 6 September 1998.

Official results
Class winners are in bold.  Cars failing to complete 70% of winner's distance are marked as Not Classified (NC).

† – #70 Marcos Racing International was disqualified for failing post-race technical inspection.  The car was found to have used fuel which did not meet FIA regulations.

‡ – #58 Roock Sportsystem was disqualified for failing post-race technical inspection.  The car was found to have used an illegal amount of turbo boost.

Statistics
 Pole position – #2 AMG Mercedes – 1:22.870
 Fastest lap – #1 AMG Mercedes – 1:25.550
 Average speed – 162.962 km/h

References

 
 
 

D
Donington 500